Hypomyelination-congenital cataract syndrome is a rare autosomal recessive hereditary disorder that affects the brain's white matter and is characterized by congenital cataract (or cataracts that begin in the first two months of life), psychomotor development delays, and moderate intellectual disabilities. It is a type of leukoencephalopathy.

Signs and symptoms 

Children with this condition are born with congenital cataract (or they have an early-onset cataract which presents before two months of life). These cataracts are caused by hypomyelination, which is the body's inability of producing nerve fiber myelin.

Development is normal for kids with this condition until the age of 1 year of life, when development and learning start slowing down, although they can learn how to walk. 

Other symptoms such as intellectual disabilities, cognitive impairment, epilepsy, ataxia, spasticity, trunk hypotonia, hyperreflexia, tremors, and difficulties with speech are also seen in patients.

Complications 

Due to the hypomyelination mentioned beforehand, individuals with this condition start losing sensation in their arms and legs, something which is known medically as peripheral neuropathy.

Although walking can be achieved by the age of 1, it can be impaired later in life due to a progressive scoliosis and muscle weakness with accompanying muscle atrophy which are often seen in patients with the condition.

Congenital cataract results in visual impairment.

Genetics 

This condition is caused by autosomal recessive mutations in the FAM126A gene, located in chromosome 7. These mutations can either be deletions, loss-of-function, or be caused by amino acid substitutions.

These mutations prevent FAM126 from making hyccin, this absence of hyccin is what causes the impaired ability of producing myelin in individuals with this condition.

Other mutations involved in hypomyelination-congenital cataract syndrome actually allow the production of a reasonable amount of hyccin, individuals with this kind of mutations don't experience peripheral neuropathy and they keep the ability of walking for a longer period of time than those who have the more common loss-of-function FAM126A mutations.

Management 

The walking impairments can be managed with physical support.

The congenital catact can be managed with intraocular lens corrective surgery, after this surgery, contact lenses can be used for the child to be able to see correctly.

Prevalence 

According to OMIM, 24 cases from 13 families in Turkey and Italy have been described in medical literature.

See also 

Hypomyelination
Congenital cataract

References 

Disorders of lens